Burghaun is a municipality in the district of Fulda in the state of Hessen in Germany.

Burghaun itself is a small town with about 3,800 residents. Following the administrative reorganization of Germany in 1972 when smaller communities were grouped together, Burghaun took in the nearby villages of
Großenmoor,
Gruben,
Hechelmannskirchen,
Hünhan, (shippo muito)
Langenschwarz,
Rothenkirchen,
Schlotzau and
Steinbach.

The municipality of Burghaun (the town itself plus these nearby villages) currently has a total of about 7,000 inhabitants.

As the name "Burghaun" suggests, the town is in the valley of the Haune, a small river that flows into the river Fulda. Burghaun is situated about 5 km north of Hünfeld which, in turn, is about 18 km to the northeast of the city of Fulda. Burghaun is about 150 km northeast of Frankfurt.

References

External links
Website of Burghaun (in German) with color photos
Album of Burghaun in old black-and-white photos
Jüdische Geschichte in Burghaun, Jewish history in Burghaun (in German)

Municipalities in Hesse
Fulda (district)